HNLMS De Ruyter is a  of the Royal Netherlands Navy. She was laid down in 2000, launched in 2002, and commissioned in 2004, the third ship of her class to enter service. The frigate is named after Dutch admiral Michiel de Ruyter (1607–1676).

Service history

Standing Group flagship
From 2005 until 2007 De Ruyter was commanded by Rob Bauer, during which period she was deployed to the Mediterranean as part of Standing NATO Maritime Group 2 as part of the NATO Response Force in Operation Active Endeavour. In late 2006, Bauer was deployed to Bahrain for five months as Deputy Commander of Combined Task Force 150 in Operation Enduring Freedom. From 12 January 2007 to July 2009 De Ruyter was commanded by Commander Jeanette Morang, the first woman to command a frigate of the Royal Netherlands Navy. Commander Harold Liebregs was De Ruyters commanding officer from December 2012.

In September and October 2007, satellite television channels in Israel were plagued with signal disruptions, with the north of the country particularly badly affected. Eventually the Ministry of Defense intervened, and with the help of the Israel Defense Forces and Israeli Sea Corps, discovered that the problems had been caused by the radar systems of Dutch UNIFIL ships patrolling off the coast of Lebanon.  De Ruyter, anchored off the coast of the Lebanon, allegedly transmitted signals onto frequencies adjacent to those used by the satellite operator.

On 12 January 2012 De Ruyter sailed from her home port of Den Helder to take up the role of flagship for Standing NATO Maritime Group 1. The group, led by Dutch Commodore Ben Bekkering, was under Dutch command for the remainder of the year, beginning on 23 January when De Ruyter assumed the flagship role in the Italian port of Taranto. De Ruyter took part in maritime operations and exercises in the Mediterranean and counterpiracy operations around the Horn of Africa, before being replaced by her sister ship  in April.

Atalanta deployments
In early 2013 De Ruyter deployed with Operation Atalanta, the EU's anti-piracy mission off the Horn of Africa. On 19 February De Ruyter was tasked to locate a group of suspected pirate skiffs reported by a Panamanian merchant ship. One was stopped and detained by the De Ruyter, the other was apprehended by the Spanish frigate . Nine suspected pirates were then detained aboard the De Ruyter. The suspected pirates were transferred to authorities in the Seychelles on 25 February for prosecution. On 27 March De Ruyters NH-90 helicopter carried out a series of exercises involving landing on the Spanish patrol vessel , the "first helicopter from another Operation Atalanta unit to land on the Spanish warship".

On 9 April 2013 De Ruyter hosted Dutch Prime Minister Mark Rutte, Defence Minister Jeanine Hennis-Plasschaert, and the Chief of Defence General Tom Middendorp on an official visit while De Ruyter was operating off the Somali coast.

Persian Gulf deployments
On 28 January 2020, De Ruyter left Nieuwe Haven to join the French-Led Task Force in the Persian Gulf.

Exercises and groups
De Ruyter served as the flagship for the maritime component of the NATO exercise "Steadfast Jazz 2013", which took place in the Baltic Sea in October and November 2013.  In September 2016 she became flagship of Standing NATO Maritime Group 2 in the Aegean Sea, replacing the German frigate  in the role. De Ruyter was in turn replaced in December 2016 by the German frigate . De Ruyter was then involved in Exercise Formidable Shield off the Scottish coast in 2017. De Ruyter was tasked with providing data from her Thales Nederland SMART-L long-range air and surface surveillance radar to a US destroyer launching a SM-3 missile against a ballistic missile target.

On 3 July 2018  De Ruyter once again became the flagship of Standing NATO Maritime Group 2, taking over from the Royal Navy's , with Dutch Commodore Boudewijn G.F.M. Boots succeeding British Commodore Mike Utley. In September 2018 De Ruyter and Standing NATO Maritime Group 2 took part in the Hellenic Navy's biennial multinational naval Exercise Naias 2018.

25 October 2018, the frigate is scheduled to take part in the NATO exercise Trident Juncture which is held in and around Norway in 2018.

Between  7 and 8 February 2020, the vessel participated in a joint training operation with the Maritime Squadron of the Armed Forces of Malta which involved various scenarios at sea. She was joined by the Maltese patrol vessel P62. The onboard NH90 was joined in the air by the Maltese AW139.

References

De Zeven Provinciën-class frigates
Frigates of the Netherlands
2002 ships
Ships built in Vlissingen